Peter Scott (1909–1989) was a British ornithologist, conservationist, painter and sportsman.

Peter Scott may also refer to:

 Peter Cameron Scott (1867–1896), Scottish-American missionary to Africa
 Pete Scott (1897–1953), baseball player
 Peter Graham Scott (1923–2007), English film producer, director, editor and screenwriter
 Peter Dale Scott (born 1929), Canadian poet and anti-war activist
 Peter Scott (Australian footballer) (born 1931), Australian rules footballer
 Peter Scott (diplomat), British diplomat, Ambassador to Norway, 1975-77 
 Peter Scott (thief) (1931–2013), British burglar and thief
 Peter Scott (educationalist) (born 1946), vice-chancellor of Kingston University
 Peter Scott (footballer, born 1952), English-born Northern Irish footballer
 Peter Scott (footballer, born 1963) (born 1963), English footballer for Fulham, Bournemouth and Barnet
 Peter Scott (cricketer, born 1982), English cricketer
 Peter Scott (cricketer, born 1912) (1912–1944), English cricketer and soldier
 Peter Scott (canoeist) (born 1973), Australian sprint canoeist
 Peter Scott (skier) (born 1990), alpine skier from South Africa
 Peter Scott (field hockey) (born 1997), English field hockey player
 G. Peter Scott (born 1945), British mathematician
 Peter Manley Scott (born 1961), British scholar and theologian

See also
 Peter Scot, an Indian whisky brand